Ondřej Pukl (28 May 1876 in Křenična – 9 February 1936 in Prague) was a Bohemian track and field athlete who competed at the 1900 Summer Olympics in Paris, France.

Pukl competed in the 800 metres.  He placed fourth or fifth in his first-round (semifinals) heat and did not advance to the final.

In the 1500 metres, Pukl finished somewhere in the bottom third of the nine-man, single-round race.

References

External links 

 De Wael, Herman. Herman's Full Olympians: "Athletics 1900". Accessed 18 March 2006.
 

1876 births
1936 deaths
Czech male middle-distance runners
Olympic athletes of Bohemia
Athletes (track and field) at the 1900 Summer Olympics
People from Příbram District
Sportspeople from the Austro-Hungarian Empire